Megaleh Amukot is a 1637 work by Rabbi Nathan Nata Spira who lived in Poland (1585–1633).

Jewish mystical texts
1637 works